Since the establishment of Islamic Revolutionary Guard Corps (Sepah Pasdaran) the organization has been involved in economic and military activities, some of them controversial.

Human rights abuses
The IRGC has been known to regularly practice torture and various other human rights abuses in order to suppress internal dissent. In 1993, Ayatollah Khamenei appointed Naghdi as deputy director of intelligence of the Quds Force, a branch of the IRGC responsible for international operations. Naghdi and his team allegedly committed numerous acts of torture and abuse.

Corruption

In 2005, the IRGC was discovered to be running an illegal airport near Karaj, close to Tehran, where they imported and exported goods with no  oversight. In 2004, the Pasdaran stormed the newly-built Imam Khomeini International Airport just after it had been officially opened and shut it down, ostensively for security reasons.  According to their critics, however, it was shut because the company hired to operate the airport was a "Turkish competitor of a Pasdaran owned business".

One Majlis member stated that IRGC black-market activities might account for $12 billion per year. Yet at the same time, IRGC and Basij forces have been commended for their positive role in fighting illegal smuggling—a further illustration of the institution’s multidimensional and frequently contradictory nature.

Involvement with Hezbollah
The IRGC's logo was inspiration for the logo of Hezbollah. The IRGC provided military training to Hezbollah fighters in the Bekaa Valley during the early eighties.

According to Jane's Information Group: Any Hezbollah member receiving military training is likely to do so at the hands of IRGC [the Islamic Revolutionary Guards Corps], either in southern Lebanon or in camps in Iran. The increasingly sophisticated methods used by IRGC members indicates that they are trained using Israeli and US military manuals; the emphasis of this training is on the tactics of attrition, mobility, intelligence gathering and night-time manoeuvres.

Involvement with Hamas
According to the New York Times, Hamas fighters are possibly being trained in urban assault tactics by the IRGC.

Alleged involvement in the Iraq War

The United States Department of Defense has repeatedly asserted IRG involvement in the Iraq War against Iranian denials, though the U.S. has stopped short of saying the central government of Iran is responsible for the actions. In May 2008, Iraq said it had no evidence that Iran was supporting militants on Iraqi soil. According to a database compiled by the Multi-National Task Force's Iraq Task Force Troy, Iranian-made weapons accounted for only a negligible percentage of weapon caches found in Iraq. The U.S. charges come as Iran and Turkey have complained that U.S.-supplied guns are flowing from Iraq to anti-government militants on their soil.

The Department has reported that it has intelligence reports of heavy Islamic Revolutionary Guard involvement in Iraq in which the force is supplying Iraqi insurgents. It is further claimed that US soldiers have been killed by Iranian-made or designed explosive devices. This claim is disputed by Iran, saying that the bulk of American military deaths in Iraq are due to a Sunni insurgency and not a Shiite one. Two different studies have maintained that approximately half of all foreign insurgents entering Iraq come from Saudi Arabia. Iran further disputes that former Iraqi army personnel, whom, prior to the 2003 invasion, the US and UK claimed were capable of deploying advanced missile systems capable of launching WMDs within 45 minutes, would be incapable of designing and producing improvised explosive devices.

The U.S. charges of Iranian support come as Iran and Turkey have complained that U.S.-supplied guns are flowing from Iraq to anti-government militants on their soil. The Government Accountability Office (GAO), the investigative arm of the US Congress, said in a report that the Pentagon cannot account for 190,000 AK-47 rifles and pistols given to Iraqi security forces. Security analysts with the Center for Defense Information, along with one senior Pentagon official, suggested that some of the weapons have probably made their way in to the hands of Iraqi insurgents. Italian arms investigators also recently stopped Iraqi government officials from illegally shipping more than 100,000 Russian-made automatic weapons into Iraq. In November 2008, the U.S. State Department prepared to slap a multimillion-dollar fine on Blackwater (renamed to Academi since 2011) for shipping hundreds of automatic weapons to Iraq without the necessary permits. Some of the weapons were believed to have ended up on the country's black market.

In January 2007 the US army detained five Iranians in northern Iraq, claiming they were Quds operatives of the IRGC, providing military assistance to Shiite militias, without offering any further evidence that lends credibility to such claims. The Iranian and Iraqi governments maintain that they were diplomats working for the Iranian consulate in Iraqi Kurdistan. The "IRGC cadres" were released as a negotiated deal for British sailors under the auspices of General Suleimani.

In December 2009 evidence uncovered during an investigation by The Guardian and Guardian Films linked the Quds force to the kidnappings of 5 Britons from a government ministry building in Baghdad in 2007. Three of the hostages, Jason Creswell, Jason Swindlehurst and Alec Maclachlan, were killed. Alan Mcmenemy's body was never found but Peter Moore was released on 30 December 2009. The investigation uncovered evidence that Moore, 37, a computer expert from Lincoln was targeted because he was installing a system for the Iraqi government that would show how a vast amount of international aid was diverted to Iran's militia groups in Iraq. One of the alleged groups funded by the Quds Force directly is the Righteous League, which emerged in 2006 and has stayed largely in the shadows as a proxy of the al-Quds force. Shia cleric and leading figure of the Righteous League, Qais Khazali, was handed over by the US military for release by the Iraqi government on December 29, 2009 as part of the deal that led to the release of Moore.

Labeling by the United States as a "terrorist organization"

On October 25, 2007, the United States labeled the Islamic Revolutionary Guard Corps and the Ministry of Defense and Armed Forces Logistics (MODAFL) as "terrorist organizations" with the Kyl–Lieberman Amendment. The Iranian Parliament responded by approving a nonbinding resolution labeling the CIA and the U.S. Army "terrorist organizations". The resolution cited U.S. involvement in dropping nuclear bombs in Japan in World War II, using depleted uranium munitions in the Balkans, bombing and killing Iraqi civilians, and torturing terror suspects in prisons, among others.

When Voice of America, the official external radio and television broadcasting service of the United States federal government, asked if the IRGC is supplying weapons to the Taliban, the current president of Iran, Mahmoud Ahmadinejad, laughed and said the US did not want Iran to be friends with Afghanistan. "What is the reason they are saying such things?" asked Ahmadinejad.

Financial sanctions

UN Security Council in several sanctions resolutions have voted in favour of freezing the assets of top Revolutionary Guard commanders.

References

Further reading
  (discusses U.S. military clashes with Iranian Revolutionary Guard during the Iran–Iraq War)

Islamic Revolutionary Guard Corps
Islamic Revolutionary Guard Corps